The 1979–80 Copa del Rey was the 78th staging of the Spanish Cup, the annual domestic cup competition in the Spanish football. The tournament was attended by 226 teams from the main categories of Spanish football.

The tournament began on 11 September 1979 and ended on 4 June 1980 with the final, held in Santiago Bernabéu Stadium in Madrid.

The final was an unusual event as Real Madrid CF faced their reserve team Castilla CF. The final score was 6–1 with Real Madrid getting their fourteenth title and avenging their loss in the final last year. This win added to the league title gave the double (third in their history) and Castilla CF qualified directly for the next edition of the UEFA Cup Winners' Cup.

The revelation of the tournament Castilla CF, became the third team from the second division to reach the final.

The defending champions, Valencia CF, were defeated 3–2 (on aggregate score) by Sporting de Gijón in the round of 16.

Format 

 All rounds are played over two legs except the final which is played a single match in a neutral venue. The team that has the higher aggregate score over the two legs progresses to the next round.
 In case of a tie on aggregate, will play an extra time of 30 minutes, and if still tied, will be decided with a penalty shoot-outs.
 The teams that play European competitions are exempt until the round of 16 or when they are removed from the tournament.
 The winners of the competition will earn a place in the group stage of next season's UEFA Cup Winners' Cup, if they have not already qualified for European competition, if so then the runners-up will instead take this berth.

First round

Second round

Third round

Fourth round

Fifth round

Bracket

Round of 16 

|}

First leg

Second leg

Quarter-finals 

|}

First leg

Second leg

Semi-finals 

|}

First leg

Second leg

Final

References

External links 

  RSSSF
  Linguasport
  Youtube: Final '80 - Real Madrid CF vs Castilla CF (Full Match)

Copa del Rey seasons
Copa del Rey
Copa